4-Hydroxyestradiol (4-OHE2), also known as estra-1,3,5(10)-triene-3,4,17β-triol, is an endogenous, naturally occurring catechol estrogen and a minor metabolite of estradiol. It is estrogenic, similarly to many other hydroxylated estrogen metabolites such as 2-hydroxyestradiol, 16α-hydroxyestrone, estriol (16α-hydroxyestradiol), and 4-hydroxyestrone but unlike 2-hydroxyestrone.

See also
 Estrogen conjugate
 Lipoidal estradiol

References

External links
 Metabocard for 4-Hydroxyestradiol - Human Metabolome Database

Sterols
Phenols
Cyclopentanols
Estranes
Estrogens
Human metabolites